Nadekan-e Jami (also Romanized as Nadekān-e Jamʿī; also known as Nadakān, Nadehkān, Nadehkān Dashar, Nadeh Kān-e Jowm‘ī, and Nadekān) is a village in Pir Sohrab Rural District, in the Central District of Chabahar County, Sistan and Baluchestan Province, Iran. At the 2006 census, its population was 137, in 30 families.

References 

Populated places in Chabahar County